Pieces of Her is an American thriller drama streaming television series created by Charlotte Stoudt, based on the 2018 novel of the same name by Karin Slaughter, that premiered on Netflix on March 4, 2022.

Between February 27, 2022 and April 3, 2022 the series was watched for 227,470,000 hours on Netflix globally according to Netflix top 10s.

Premise
 
Pieces of Her follows the story of Andy, a 30-year-old woman who is caught in a deadly mass shooting at a local diner. Moments later, she witnesses her mother, Laura, violently eliminate the threat with ease. As Andy begins to unravel her mother's actions on that day, her perspective on their entire familial relationship takes a new turn. Soon, figures from her mother's past reappear, and she is forced to escape. On the journey, she attempts to find the truth that her mother buried long ago.

Cast and characters

Main

 Toni Collette as Laura Oliver, a speech pathologist and breast cancer survivor living in Belle Isle, Georgia who has a dark past. It is later revealed that her real name is Jane Queller.
 Bella Heathcote as Andy Oliver, Laura's daughter who moved back to take care of her mother
 Omari Hardwick as Gordon Oliver, Laura's ex-husband and Andy's stepfather
 David Wenham as Jasper Queller, the current CEO of Quellcorp
 Jessica Barden as Jane Queller, Laura's younger self in the late 1980s who was daughter of a powerful pharmaceutical CEO
 Jacob Scipio as Michael Vargas, a U.S. Marshal
 Joe Dempsie as young Nick Harp, Jane's former lover and the leader of a domestic terrorist group, Army of the Changing World from the late 1980s

Recurring

 Terry O'Quinn as Martin Queller, the founder and former CEO of Quellcorp and the Queller siblings' father
 Gil Birmingham as Charlie Bass, Laura's Witness Protection Program handler
 Aaron Jeffery as Nick (present day), Andy's biological father who has been on the run for 30 years
 Calum Worthy as young Jasper, Jasper's younger self in the late 1980s

Production

Development
On February 5, 2019, it was announced that Netflix had given the production an 8-episode series order. The series was created and executive produced by Lesli Linka Glatter, Charlotte Stoudt and Bruna Papandrea. Production companies involved with the series consist of Made Up Stories and Endeavor Content. Stoudt is also credited as the writer and showrunner of the series, whilst Minkie Spiro directed all eight episodes. The series premiered on March 4, 2022.

Casting
In February 2020, Toni Collette and Bella Heathcote were cast in starring roles. In May 2020, it was announced that David Wenham was cast in a starring role. In January 2021, Jessica Barden, Joe Dempsie, Jacob Scipio, and Omari Hardwick joined the main cast. In February 2021, Gil Birmingham, Terry O’Quinn and Calum Worthy joined the cast in recurring roles. In April 2021, Nicholas Burton and Aaron Jeffery were cast in recurring capacities.

Filming
Principal photography for the series was originally expected to begin on March 16, 2020 and conclude on July 17, 2020 in Burnaby, British Columbia. Following an AU$21.58 million investment from the Australian Government, shared with the production of Spiderhead to boost the local economy during the COVID-19 pandemic, the production was lured to Sydney, Australia, where filming took place in early 2021.

Episodes

Reception
The review aggregator website Rotten Tomatoes reported a 50% approval rating with an average rating of 5.7/10, based on 34 critic reviews. The website's critics consensus reads, "While Toni Collette heroically tries to bring Pieces of Her together, this lumbering mystery is too bogged down by backstory to satisfyingly cohere." Metacritic, which uses a weighted average, assigned a score of 52 out of 100 based on 18 critics, indicating "mixed or average reviews".

Angie Han writing for The Hollywood Reporter praised Collette's performance throughout the series as "fascinating to watch". Han also noted that the series eventually "loses steam" after the first three episodes, describing Heathcote's character as merely "a mechanism propelling the narrative forward" with little to no character development.

References

External links
 
 

2020s American drama television series
2022 American television series debuts
American thriller television series
English-language Netflix original programming
Television series about cults
Television series by Made Up Stories
Television shows based on American novels
Television shows filmed in Australia
Television shows filmed in Burnaby
Television shows set in Georgia (U.S. state)
Television shows set in San Francisco